Twenty One Gms is a 2022 Indian Malayalam-language crime thriller film written and directed by Bibin Krishna (in his feature film debut). The film stars Anoop Menon as Crime Branch DYSP Nanda Kishore who investigates a series of murders that takes place within a week. It also features Renji Panicker, Leona Lishoy, Anu Mohan and Ranjith in supporting roles. The soundtrack was composed by Deepak Dev, with lyrics written by Vinayak Sasikumar.

Twenty One Gms was released in theatres on 18 March 2022. It received positive reviews from critics.

Plot

Nanda Kishore is the Deputy Superintendent at the Police Crime Branch, who lives a sad life with his wife Gauri after their only daughter passes away. 
Anjali works a biomedical engineer at a multispecialty hospital in the city and comes across incriminating evidence against her hospital's Managing Director, John Samuel. She plans to hand over this evidence to an independent journalist Shihab, but before she could hand over the dossier, Shihab dies from a cardiac arrest and Anjali herself is also killed by John's henchman, Tipper Tony and employee Dr. Nikhil when they try to recover the dossier from her. Upon learning his sister's death, Anjali's brother Martin arrives from the US. John realizes that Martin is also a threat and sends Tony to finish him off. CI Sreenivasan gets a call that night about Martin's death as the neighbours got the stench of burning flesh. 

Investigation tightens as they start interrogating Jimmy, Martin's best friend and business partner. A manhunt for Tony also begins as he and his car are found to be missing. Meanwhile, Kishore's brother-in-law Vinay also gets involved as he begins to tail Dr. Nikhil one night after some suspicions arise. Further investigations reveal the malpractice that happened at John's hospital in testing unauthorized drugs on kids. Finding Tony's whereabouts and the perpetrators (spoiler alert) behind the mysterious deaths form the climax of the story.

Cast
 Anoop Menon as Nanda Kishore, Crime Branch DYSP
 Leona Lishoy as Gouri, Kishore's wife
 Alexander Prasanth as CI Sreenivasan
 Anu Mohan as SI Sunny
 Dilip Nambiar as  Police Surgeon
 Ranjith as Dr. John Samuel
 Manasa Radhakrishnan as Anjali
 Chandunath G Nair as Martin
 Vivek Anirudh as Vinay
 Lena as Rachel IPS, Crime Branch SP 
 Aji John as Jimmy
 Jeeva Joseph as Nikhil Narayanan
 Bineesh Bastin as Tipper Tonny
 Nandhu as Fr. Joseph
 Mareena Michael Kurisingal as Abhirami
 Shanker Ramakrishnan as Shihab Mohammed, an investigative journalist
 Renji Panicker as Dr. Alex Koshy, psychiatrist
 Rajeesh Kartha as flower merchant

Production
The film is the directorial debut of Bibin Krishna, an IT engineer. The film was also produced by his IT colleague Rinish K. N. who was keen to produce films. In June 2021, Krishna told to The Hindu that he had the screenplay completed four years ago but he used this time to improve his knowledge in filmmaking by working in short films. Anoop Menon heard the story in December 2020, who suggested to start filming in January 2021, they managed to start filming with the next 15 days. It was shot in Kochi and Vagamon. Filming was completed in March 2021 just before the COVID-19 pandemic in India.

Music
The soundtrack was composed by Deepak Dev, with lyrics written by Vinayak Sasikumar.

Release
The film was released in theatres on 18 March 2022. It was digitally released for streaming on Disney+ Hotstar on 10 June 2022. The satellite rights of the film were acquired by Asianet.

Reception
The film generally received positive reviews from critics and audience. The Times of India rated the film 4 out of 5 stars and wrote "A thriller that saves its twists till the end"

See also
 21 Grams, a 2003 American film.

References

External links
 

Indian crime thriller films
Fictional portrayals of the Kerala Police
Films about organised crime in India
Films shot in Kochi
2022 thriller films
2022 directorial debut films